"Cuz I Can" is a song written by Pink, Max Martin and Lukasz Gottwald for Pink's fourth album, I'm Not Dead, from which it was released as the seventh and final single for the album. It was one of the five album tracks that leaked onto the internet in July 2005.

Lyrics and composition
Lyrically, the song is about Pink playing by her own rules, and boasting about her "bling", a contrast to the anti-consumerist content of "Stupid Girls", another track on the album. Referring to Cuz I Can", she called herself "a walking contradiction" and "a hypocrite sometimes."

Release
The track was sent to radio stations in Australia on October 4, 2007. It debuted at number 33 on the Australian ARIA Digital Track Chart and peaked at number 14. The track debuted at number 39 on the New Zealand Singles Chart, becoming the first single to chart on download sales alone. It peaked at number 29. Cuz I Can" was sent to Russian radio station on December 24, 2007. Single peaked at number 46 on the national radio chart.

Music video
The official music video for the song was first seen on Australian television on October 5, 2007, and footage of a live performance from the I'm Not Dead Tour. The performance, which was the show opener for the tour, featured dancers dressed like monks and with only underwear beneath their robes.

Charts

References

2005 songs
2007 singles
Pink (singer) songs
Songs written by Max Martin
Songs written by Dr. Luke
Songs written by Pink (singer)
Song recordings produced by Max Martin